Richard Wharton (c. 1765 – 21 October 1828) was a British barrister and politician.

Wharton studied at Pembroke College, Cambridge and became barrister of the Inner Temple in 1789. He successfully stood as a Tory for the constituency of Durham in 1802, but his election was voided in February 1804, "his payment of the travelling expenses of the non-resident freemen having been construed as bribery." He was elected again in 1806, and held the seat until 1820.

Wharton was appointed Chairman of Ways and Means in January 1808, and Secretary to the Treasury in December 1809, a post he held until January 1814.

He was elected a Fellow of the Royal Society in 1810.

Samuel Egerton Brydges described Wharton as a man "of quick talents, much literature, and most pleasing manners, hospitable and open; a man of the world, of a handsome person and benevolent expression."

References

External links 
 

1760s births
1828 deaths
Alumni of Pembroke College, Cambridge
Members of the Inner Temple
Members of the Parliament of the United Kingdom for English constituencies
UK MPs 1802–1806
UK MPs 1806–1807
UK MPs 1807–1812
UK MPs 1812–1818
UK MPs 1818–1820
Fellows of the Royal Society
Tory MPs (pre-1834)